Encephalartos hildebrandtii is a species of cycad in the Zamiaceae family. It is native to Kenya and Tanzania at elevations of 0 to 600 meters.

Description
These plants have an erect stem, without branches, about 6 meters high and 30 cm in diameter, covered with linear cataphyll, covered with a thick yellowish hairs.

The leaves, arranged in a crown at the apex of the stem, supported by a tomentose petiole 1–7 cm long, are 200–300 cm long and are composed of numerous lanceolate leaflets, 20–26 cm long, 28–36 mm wide, arranged on the spine at 45-80°; the basal leaflets are reduced to thorns.

It is a dioecious species, with male specimens having 1-7 cylindrical-fusiform cones, sessile, green or yellow in color, 20–50 cm long and 5–9 cm in diameter, with large, rhombic-shaped microsporophylls, and specimens feminine that hold from 1 to 4 cylindrical cones, of yellow color, 28–60 cm long and 15–25 cm broad, with rhomboid macrosporophylls.

The seeds have an oblong shape, are 28–60 mm long, 15–25 cm in diameter and are covered by a yellow-to-red color sarcotesta.

Gallery

References

External links
 
 

hildebrandtii
Plants described in 1874
Taxa named by Alexander Braun